Acrotrichis josephi is a species of feather-winged beetle.

Distribution
In New Zealand, the species is exotic and present in the wild.

References

Beetles described in 1872
Terrestrial biota of New Zealand
Beetles of New Zealand